The Collection is a compilation album released by English heavy metal band Black Sabbath in 1992. The album was released on the label Castle, who released two CD versions of this album in the UK, both with the same cover art and songs. The album includes greatest songs of Black Sabbath with Ozzy Osbourne prior to his dismissal in 1979, from the eponymous album to Never Say Die!. The album has 15 tracks, two from Black Sabbath, two from Paranoid, one from Master of Reality, two from Black Sabbath Vol. 4, two from Sabbath Bloody Sabbath, two from Sabotage, two from Technical Ecstasy and two from Never Say Die!.

Track listing 
All songs credited to Tony Iommi, Ozzy Osbourne, Geezer Butler and Bill Ward.

 "Paranoid" – 2:52
 "Tomorrow's Dream" – 3:09
 "Back Street Kids" – 3:47
 "Symptom of the Universe" – 3:49
 "Never Say Die" – 3:49
 "Junior's Eyes" – 6:43
 "Dirty Women" – 7:09
 "Am I Going Insane (Radio)" – 4:16
 "Supernaut" – 4:43
 "The Wizard" – 4:25
 "A National Acrobat" – 6:13
 "Electric Funeral" – 4:52
 "Into the Void" – 6:12
 "Spiral Architect" – 5:31
 "Wicked World" – 4:43

Personnel 
 Ozzy Osbourne – lead vocals, harmonica
 Tony Iommi – guitars
 Geezer Butler – bass
 Bill Ward – drums

References 

Black Sabbath compilation albums
1992 compilation albums